The Australasian Plant Pathology Society (APPS) is a scientific association whose members study plant diseases. Its members are located in Australia, New Zealand and Papua New Guinea, and also the Indian, Pacific and Asian regions. The society was founded in 1969.

As part of their membership in APPS, members are also associate members of the International Society for Plant Pathology.

The 2013 APPS conference was held in Auckland, New Zealand.

Journals 
 Australasian Plant Pathology
 Australasian Plant Disease Notes 
The official journals of the society, Australasian Plant Pathology  and Australasian Plant Disease Notes, are published by Springer Science+Business Media.

References

External links

See also 
 British Society for Plant Pathology
 Plant Pathology (journal)

Phytopathology
Organizations established in 1969
Scientific organisations based in Australia
Scientific organisations based in New Zealand
Biology societies